Greg Strachan (born 5 September 1958) is a former Australian rules football player who played in the Victorian Football League (VFL) between 1978 and 1988 for the Richmond Football Club.

Strachan is currently working as an optometrist in his own business in Balwyn, Victoria.

References

 Hogan P: The Tigers Of Old, Richmond FC, Melbourne 1996

External links
 
 

1958 births
Living people
Richmond Football Club players
Richmond Football Club Premiership players
People educated at Camberwell Grammar School
Australian rules footballers from Victoria (Australia)
One-time VFL/AFL Premiership players